Ernesto del Castillo Ontiveros (21 November 1929 – 3 January 2019) was a Mexican equestrian. He competed in two events at the 1968 Summer Olympics.

References

External links
 

1929 births
2019 deaths
Mexican male equestrians
Olympic equestrians of Mexico
Equestrians at the 1968 Summer Olympics
Sportspeople from Veracruz
People from Tuxpan, Veracruz